Serapion of Nitria, Serapion of Thmuis, or Serapion the Scholastic was an early Christian monk and bishop of Thmuis in Lower Egypt (modern-day Tell el-Timai), born in the 4th century. He is notable for fighting with Athanasius of Alexandria against Arianism.

Life 
Serapion is quoted in four sections of the Sayings of the Desert Fathers, where he is called Abba Serapion. He was given the title "The Angel of the Church of Thmuis" by Evagrius Ponticus in Gnostikos.

Monasticism 
Before becoming a monk, Serapion was educated in Alexandria. He then became the abbot of the Monastery of Arsina, which at one point held as many as eleven-thousand monks. He was given the title "the Great" by the early Christian historians Sozomen and Palladius.

As a monk, he was a companion and disciple of Anthony the Great, who at his deathbed bequeathed to him one of his two sheepskin cloaks (the other went to Athanasius).

Episcopate 
In his later life , he was made the bishop of Thmuis (near Diospolis) where he served until his death . Jerome in his work On Illustrous Men noted that Serapion was given the apellation "Scholasticus" (the Scholastic) because of his meticulous scholarship. During his episcopate, he helped Athanasius fight against Arianism in Alexandria, and at his request, Athanasius wrote to him a series of three dogmatic letters on the theology of the Holy Spirit. These letters, which were written , are considered to be among the earliest Christian texts dedicated exclusively to the Holy Spirit. Serapion was one of the most trusted companions of Athanasius and even took care of his episcopal see during one of his exiles. In AD 353, Athanasius placed Serapion at the head of a delegation to Emperor Constantius II to plead guilty against the charges of the Arians. In 343, Serapion attended the Council of Serdica. Serapion was exiled by the Arians in AD 350, and died .

Story from the Sayings of the Desert Fathers 
Serapion is said of have paid a prostitute, but instead of engaging in relations with her, prayed all night in front of her and eventually converted her to Christianity. She later became a nun at a monastery, practicing extreme ascetic labors. The same story also exists in a poetic Hymn of Praise in The Prologue of Ohrid.

List of works 

 The Life of Anthony (not to be confused with the Life of Anthony by Athanasius).
 Sacramentary of Serapion of Thmuis (a prayer book which includes the earliest written Sanctus).
 Treatise against the Manichees.
 Treatises on the Titles of the Psalms (quoted by Jerome, but which are now lost).
 A Letter to the Disciples of Anthony (written after Anthony's death in 356. First published in the 1950s, exists only in Syriac and Armenian).
 A Letter of Consolation to a Bishop (written to a certain Bishop Eudoxius).
 A Letter to the Solitaries of Alexandria on the dignity of the religious life.
 A Letter on the Father and the Son.

Selected quotes 
 "Do not think that sickness is difficult; only sin is difficult. Sickness follows the sinners only in life, but sin follows the sinner into the grave." (Sayings of the Desert Fathers).

 "When the soldiers of the emperor are standing at attention, they cannot look to the right or left; it is the same for the man who stands before God and looks towards Him in fear at all time; he cannot then fear anything from the enemy." (Sayings of the Desert Fathers).
 "As soon as this earth's great elder, the blessed Antony, who prayed for the whole world, departed, everything has been torn apart and is in anguish, and the wrath devastates Egypt. While he was truly on earth, he extended his hands and prayed and spoke with God all day long. He did not let the wrath descend on us. Lifting up his thoughts, he kept it from coming down. But now that those hands are closed, no one else can be found who might halt the violence." (A Letter to the Disciples of Anthony).

Further reading 

 Agaiby, Elizabeth (2018). Arabic Life Of Antony Attributed To Serapion Of Thmuis. Brill. .
 Athanasius' letters to Serapion on the Holy Spirit.
 Casey, R. P (1931). Serapion of Thmuis against the Manichees. Cambridge: Harvard University Press. .
 DelCogliano, Mark; Radde-Gallwitz, Andrew; Ayres, Lewis (2011). Works on the Spirit: Athanasius's letters to Serapion on the Holy Spirit, and, Didymus's On the Holy Spirit. Yonkers, NY: St Vladimir's Seminary Press. Popular Patristics series. .
 Dragüet, René (1951). Une lettre de Sérapion de Thmuis aux disciples d’Antoine (A.D. 356) en version syriaque et arménienne. Le Muséon. There is an English translation by Rowan A. Greer in Tim Vivian and Apostolos N. Athnassalis, Athanasius of Alexandria: The Life of Antony (Kalamazoo: Cistercian Publications, 2003), pp. 39–47. .
 Fitschen, Klaus (1992). Serapion Von Thmuis: Echte Und Unechte Schriften Sowie Die Zeugnisse Des Athanasius Und Anderer. Walter De Gruyter Inc. .
 Troiano, Marina Silvia (2001). Il Contra Eunomium III di Basilio di Cesarea e le Epistolae ad Serapionem I-IV di Atanasio di Alessandria: nota comparativa. Augustinianum. .

See also 

 Desert Fathers
 Athanasius of Alexandria
 Anthony the Great
 Thmuis
 Sayings of the Desert Fathers

References 

Egyptian Christian monks
Saints from Roman Egypt
Coptic Orthodox saints
Desert Fathers
Eastern Orthodox saints
Christian ascetics
3rd-century Egyptian people
4th-century Egyptian people
Egyptian hermits
3rd-century Christian saints
4th-century Christian saints
3rd-century Romans
4th-century Romans
4th-century Christian monks
3rd-century Christian monks
358 deaths